Hassan al-Ghabbash (born 1971) is a Syrian doctor and politician. He has been the Health Minister since 2020.

Education and career
1998: Graduated from Faculty of Medicine of Damascus University
1998–2002: Otolaryngologist (ORL–H&N) in al-Mouwasat University Hospital
2003: Member of the American Academy of ear, nose and throat disease (ORL)
2003–2020: Specialist supervisor doctor at al-Mouwasat University Hospital
2014–2017: Head of the Syrian Association of Otorhinolaryngology doctors
2017: Member of the Syrian Board and Chairman of the Training Committee for ORL diseases
2019: Head of Damascus Doctors Syndicate
2020–present: Minister of Health, he has been responding to the COVID-19 pandemic in Syria.
2021: Elected to the Executive Council of World Health Organization

Personal life
He is married and has two children.

See also
Cabinet of Syria
Second Hussein Arnous government
Otorhinolaryngology

References 

Living people
1971 births
21st-century Syrian politicians
Damascus University alumni
Syrian ministers of health
Syrian physicians